The Gardener's Labyrinth or The Gardeners Labyrinth was an early popular book about gardening.  It was written by Thomas Hill, using the pseudonym Didymus Mountain, with Henry Dethick and published in 1577.

References

1577 books
1577 in England
English non-fiction books
Gardening in England
Works published under a pseudonym
Gardening books